Duško Pijetlović (25 April 1985) is a Serbian water polo center forward for VK Novi Beograd. He was a member of the Serbia men's national water polo teams that won Olympic gold medals in 2016 and 2020, and bronze medals at the 2008 and 2012 Olympics. He held the world title in 2009 and 2015 and the European title in 2006, 2012, 2014, 2016 and 2018. Pijetlović won three consecutive Euroleague titles with three teams: in 2011 with Partizan in 2012 with Pro Recco and in 2013 with Crvena Zvezda.

Club career

Pro Recco
On 17 September 2011, in the first round of the Adriatic League, Pijetlović and Sandro Sukno were the top scorers with each scoring three times in an easy 14–6 home win against Jadran HN. In the second round on 24 September, he scored a goal against Koper Rokava in a 16–4 home win. On 1 October Pijetlović scored two goals in a 10–7 Adriatic League away win against VK Jug. On 8 October in the Adriatic League fourth round, Pijetlović and his team-mate and fellow countryman Prlainović were the top scorers with each scoring three times in a 14–8 away win against Medveščak. Pijetlović was again the top scorer of the fifth round in his team on 15 October, he scored three goals in a 15–8 home win against Primorje EB. On 22 October Pijetlović scored a goal in the first round of the Euroleague Group in an easy 13–5 win over Spartak Volgograd. On 26 October Pijetlović scored another goal in an easy 15–5 away win against Jadran ST, but this time in the sixth round of the Adriatic League. On 29 October, in the Adriatic League seventh round 13–9 home win against Mladost, Pijetlović scored three goals. Pijetlović scored his sixteenth Adriatic League goal on 5 November, in a 14–7 away win against Šibenik. On 9 November Pijetlović scored his second goal of the tournament in the second round of the Euroleague, in a 13–4 away victory against CN Marseille. But just after 3 days, on 12 November, he scored an amazing five goals for his team in 16–7 away win against Budva M:tel, in the ninth round of the Adriatic League. On 26 November Pijetlović scored two goals in the Euroleague third round, in a 10–8 win against VK Jadran HN. On 30 November he scored another two goals, but in the eleventh round Adriatic League 16–1 away win over Primorac. Pijetlović managed to score just one goal on 3 December in a humiliating 21–0 defeat over POŠK in the twelfth round of the Adriatic League. In the thirteenth round on 10 December, Pijetlović scored two goals against Mornar BS in a 20–8 away win. Pijetlović scored three goals on 14 December in the fourth round of the Euroleague, in a 14–9 away win against VK Jadran HN. How the tournament went on, Duško Pijetlović lifted his form. On 8 February 2012. in the fifth round of the Euroleague, he scored an astonishing seven goals in a 15–7 win against CN Marseille. With seven goals scored he doubled up his tally to fourteen goals overall in Euroleague so far. 3 days later he scored his 27th goal in Adriatic League fifteenth round 9–8 home win against Jug CO. He made it 30 in a win over Primorje EB by 13–6 on 18 February, in the sixteenth round. On 25 February, in the last round of the Euroleague group stage, Pijetlović scored three goals in the 18–7 away win against Spartak Volgograd. Four days later, Pijetlović alongside his team-mate Filipović scored five goals in the Adriatic League fourteenth-round game behind, in a 21–5 easy home win over Mornar BS. On 3 March Pijetlović scored a goal in a 12–7 Adriatic League away win against Mladost.

National career
On 16 January, at the European Championship Pijetlović scored in the first game two goals in an 8–5 win against Spain. In the second game, on 17 January, Pijetlović scored four goals for his national team helping them in a 13–12 win over Germany. On 19 January, in a difficult game against the defending European champions Croatia, Pijetlović scored two goals in a 15–12 win. On 21 January in the fourth match, Pijetlović was the top scorer with four goals in a routine victory against Romania 14–5. On 23 January, in the last round of group A, which Serbia lost to Montenegro with 11–7, Pijetlović scored two goals. Duško Pijetlović won the 2012 European Championship on 29 January. He scored a goal in the final against Montenegro which his national team won by 9–8. This was his second gold medal at the European Championships.

Honours

Club
VK Partizan
 Serbian Championship: 2006–07, 2007–08, 2008–09, 2009–10, 2010–11
 Serbian Cup: 2006–07, 2007–08, 2008–09, 2009–10, 2010–11
 LEN Champions League: 2010–11
 Eurointer League; 2010, 2011
Sintez Kazan
Russian Championship: 2013–14
Pro Recco
 Serie A1: 2011–12, 2014–15, 2015–16
Coppa Italia: 2014–15, 2015–16
 LEN Champions League: 2011–12, 2014–15
LEN Super Cup: 2015
 Adriatic League: 2011–12

VK Crvena Zvezda
 Serbian Championship: 2012–13
 Serbian Cup: 2012–13
 LEN Champions League: 2012–13
Dynamo Moscow
Russian Chanmpionship: 2017–18, 2018–19
Russian Cup: 2017–18, 2018–19
Szolnok 
Hungarian Championship: 2020–21
LEN Euro Cup: 2020–21
VK Novi Beograd
LEN Champions League runners-up: 2021–22
 Adriatic League: 2021–22
 Serbian Championship: 2021–22

Awards
 Swimming World magazine's man water polo "World Player of the Year" award: 2015
 LEN  "European Player of the Year" award: 2015
Member of the World Team by total-waterpolo: 2021
Member of Second World Team of the Year's 2000–2020  by total-waterpolo
2013 World Championship Team of the Tournament
2015 World Championship Team of the Tournament
 World Championship MVP: 2015
 Adriatic League MVP : 2021–22

Personal life
Pijetlović is married to Marina and has two sons. His older brother Gojko Pijetlović is yet another Serbian prominent water polo player.

See also
 Serbia men's Olympic water polo team records and statistics
 List of Olympic champions in men's water polo
 List of Olympic medalists in water polo (men)
 List of world champions in men's water polo
 List of World Aquatics Championships medalists in water polo

References

External links

 
 

1985 births
Living people
Sportspeople from Novi Sad
Serbian male water polo players
Water polo centre forwards
Water polo players at the 2008 Summer Olympics
Water polo players at the 2012 Summer Olympics
Water polo players at the 2016 Summer Olympics
Water polo players at the 2020 Summer Olympics
Medalists at the 2008 Summer Olympics
Medalists at the 2012 Summer Olympics
Medalists at the 2016 Summer Olympics
Medalists at the 2020 Summer Olympics
Olympic gold medalists for Serbia in water polo
Olympic bronze medalists for Serbia in water polo
World Aquatics Championships medalists in water polo
European champions for Serbia
Competitors at the 2009 Mediterranean Games
Competitors at the 2018 Mediterranean Games
Mediterranean Games medalists in water polo
Mediterranean Games gold medalists for Serbia
Serbian expatriate sportspeople in Italy
Serbian expatriate sportspeople in Russia